Knowlson Gift is a politician in Trinidad and Tobago. He is a member of the People's National Movement. Gift served as Minister of Foreign Affairs between May 7 and May 17, 1995, but resigned in the face of allegations of financial improprieties at the end of his stint as High Commissioner to Jamaica, where he served between 1984 and 1987. He was re-appointed to the Senate and as Minister of Foreign Affairs in 2001 when Patrick Manning was re-appointed Prime Minister. He served as foreign minister until October 2006.

References

Foreign ministers of Trinidad and Tobago
Government ministers of Trinidad and Tobago
High Commissioners of Trinidad and Tobago to Jamaica
Living people
Members of the Senate (Trinidad and Tobago)
People's National Movement politicians
Year of birth missing (living people)